Friedrich Krupp Germaniawerft (often just called Germaniawerft, "Germania shipyard") was a German shipbuilding company, located in the harbour at Kiel, and one of the largest and most important builders of U-boats for the Kaiserliche Marine in World War I and the Kriegsmarine in World War II. The original company was founded in 1867 but went bankrupt and was bought out by Friedrich Krupp. A total of 84 U-boats were built in the shipyard during the war. After the war it returned to the normal production of yachts and transports.

History
The company was founded in 1867 by Lloyd Foster, as the Norddeutsche Schiffbau-Gesellschaft, in the town of Gaarden, near Kiel. The idea of the company was to construct war and merchant ships.

The company went bankrupt in 1879 and had to be sold and became property of the Märkisch-Schlesischen Maschinenbau und Hütten-Aktiengesellschaft. They had constructed steam engines in Berlin since 1822. A few years later this company also got in trouble and in late 1882 a new company was founded, the Schiff- und Maschinenbau-Actien-Gesellschaft Germania.

A few more warships were constructed and the company also had a very good reputation concerning the construction of torpedo boats. However the financial problems were never far away and by the end of August 1896 Krupp took over, as they were very interested in building warships themselves. Between 1898 and 1902 the company doubled its surface and new and large slips were constructed. In 1902 the company changed name and became the Friedrich Krupp Germaniawerft.

In 1908, Germaniawerft built the schooner Germania for Gustav Krupp von Bohlen und Halbach, based on a design from Max Oertz. It was the first yacht of its size built in Germany. During the First World War, the company turned to building U-boats. A total of 84 U-boats were delivered to the Kaiserliche Marine.

Afterwards, it returned to its original vocation, including building the steel-hulled barque Magdalene Vinnen II, now  and the largest traditional sailing ship still afloat.

During World War II, the Germaniawerft was one of the most important suppliers of the Kriegsmarine, because of its proximity to German naval facilities in Kiel. Over the course of the war, the company completed 131 U-boats (types II, VII, XB, XIV, XVII, and XXIII). The Kriegsmarine had in total ordered 240 U-boats. In 1944, the shipyard had over 10,000 employees, of which roughly 11% were forced labourers.

On 26 April 1945, the last U-boat built in the Germaniawerft was launched, . The war ended before it could enter into service.

After the war, the partially ruined shipyard was one of the first facilities dismantled by the victorious Allies. The population of heavily bombed Kiel protested furiously this decision, but to no avail. The site was broken up and not rebuilt. In the late 1960s, the grounds were purchased by Howaldtswerke-Deutsche Werft as a submarine-building shipyard. As of 2015, submarines are being built at the site.

Ships built by Germaniawerft (selection)

Civilian ships

Merchant ships
 Mary (1920), schooner, later museum ship Carthaginian II at Lahaina, Maui, Hawaii, scuttled in 2005
 Magadelene Vinnen II (1921), 4-masted barque, today Russian sail training ship STS Sedov
 , 5-masted barquentine that sank on her maiden voyage.

Yachts
  Vanadis a/k/a Lady Hutton (1924)
 Coronet (1928), during World War II patrol boat 
 Nourmahal (1928)
 Haida (1929), during World War II patrol boat 
 Orion (1929), later gunboat  and cruise ship Regina Maris
 Etak (1930)
 Talitha G (ex-Reveler) (1930)
 Santa Maria Del Mare (ex-Vita) (1931)
 Alva (1931), later  
 Hussar II (1931), later Sea Cloud

Naval ships

Battleships
  (1890)
  (1898)
  (1899)
  (1901)
  (1902)
  (1904)
  (1907)
  (1910)
  (1911)
  (1914)

Cruisers
  (1892)
  (1912)
  (1936)

Destroyers
 Destroyers Z.9 - Z.13 (Type Zerstörer 1934A)
 Destroyers Z.37 - Z.39 (Type Zerstörer 1936A (Mob))

Submarines (U-boats)
  (Imperial Russian Navy)
 Karp-class submarine (Imperial Russian Navy)
 A-class submarines (Royal Norwegian Navy)
 U-3-class submarines (Austro-Hungarian Navy)
 Type U 1 submarines
 Type U 5 submarines
 Type U 16 submarines
 Type U 23 submarines
 Type U 31 submarines
 Type U 51 submarines
 Type U 63 submarines
 Type U 66 submarines
 Type U 81 submarines
 Type U 93 submarines
 Type U 139 submarines
 Type U 142 submarines
 Type UB I submarines
 Type UB III submarines
 Type UC II submarines
 Type II submarines
 Type VII submarines
 Type XB submarines
 Type XIV submarines
 Type XVII submarines
 Type XXIII submarines

Torpedo boats

Minelayers
 , now museum ship in Mersin, Turkey

Notes

External links

 

 

Shipbuilding companies of Germany
Companies of Prussia
Companies established in 1867
Defunct manufacturing companies of Germany
Kiel